Stanner railway station was a station in Stanner, Powys, Wales. The station was opened by the Kington and Eardisley Railway in 1875.

References

Further reading

Disused railway stations in Powys
Railway stations in Great Britain opened in 1875
Railway stations in Great Britain closed in 1951
Former Great Western Railway stations